The 2014–15 Chicago Blackhawks season was the 89th season for the National Hockey League (NHL) franchise that was established on September 25, 1926. The Blackhawks finished the season with a 48–28–6 record, finishing in third place in the Central Division. They defeated the Nashville Predators in the first round of the Stanley Cup playoffs, four games to two. In the next round, they swept the Minnesota Wild in four games. In the Western Conference Finals, the 'Hawks outlasted the Anaheim Ducks, winning the series four games to three. In the Stanley Cup Finals, they faced the Tampa Bay Lightning. On June 15, 2015, the team won the Stanley Cup, defeating the Lightning four games to two and winning the Cup at home for the first time since 1938. This was the Blackhawks' third Cup championship in six seasons. Duncan Keith received the Conn Smythe trophy as MVP of the playoffs.

On December 21, 2014, the Blackhawks debuted a special decal in remembrance of the passing of assistant equipment manager Clinton "Clint" Reif who died during the season, the Blackhawks wore "CR" on their helmets for the remainder of the 2014–15 season.

Off-season
On July 14, 2014, the Blackhawks announced that Kevin Dineen, a former teammate of head coach Joel Quenneville, had been hired as an assistant coach.

Pre-season
The Chicago Blackhawks' pre-season schedule included a September 28, 2014, exhibition game held at the Credit Union Centre in Saskatoon, Saskatchewan, against the Edmonton Oilers.

Standings

Playoffs

The Chicago Blackhawks entered the playoffs as the Central Division's third seed. The Blackhawks lost the last four games of the regular season, thus they did not win the Central Division title. After defeating the Nashville Predators four games to two in the first round, they went on to sweep the Minnesota Wild in the second round, then defeated the Anaheim Ducks four games to three in the Western Conference Final. It was only the third time in Blackhawks history that they had won a playoff series after trailing three games to two. On May 19, 2015, the Blackhawks played the longest game in their history (116:12) against the Ducks as part of the Western Conference Finals. The Blackhawks defeated Anaheim in Game 7 and moved on to face the Tampa Bay Lightning in the Stanley Cup Final. On June 15, 2015, Chicago won the Stanley Cup in Game 6 by a 2–0 scoreline. This marked the Blackhawks' third Stanley Cup victory in six seasons. This was the first Blackhawks Stanley Cup clinched on home ice in 77 years, having won the decisive games in 2010 and 2013 titles on the road, and the first time a Stanley Cup title has been won in Chicago since 1992 when the Pittsburgh Penguins defeated the Blackhawks at Chicago Stadium. It was also the first time any Chicago sports team won a Championship at home since the Chicago Bulls in 1997

Schedule and results

Pre-season

Regular season

Detailed records

Playoffs

Player stats
Final stats

Skaters

Goaltenders

†Denotes player spent time with another team before joining the Blackhawks.  Stats reflect time with the Blackhawks only.
‡Denotes player was traded mid-season.  Stats reflect time with the Blackhawks only.
Bold/italics denotes franchise record.

Notable achievements

Awards

Milestones

All Star Game 
Chicago Blackhawks NHL All-Star representatives at the 2015 National Hockey League All-Star Game in Columbus, Ohio at Nationwide Arena.

 Corey Crawford, G, (Team Toews)
 Jonathan Toews, C, Captain, (Team Toews)
 Patrick Kane, RW, Assistant Captain, (Team Foligno), Winner of the Accuracy Shooting event in the skills competition.
 Duncan Keith, D, (Team Foligno)
 Brent Seabrook, D, (Team Toews)

Transactions
The Blackhawks have been involved in the following transactions during the 2014–15 season.

Trades

Free agents acquired

Free agents lost

Claimed via waivers

Lost via waivers

Player signings

Other

Suspensions/fines

Draft picks

Below are the Chicago Blackhawks' selections made at the 2014 NHL Entry Draft, held on June 27–28, 2014, at the Wells Fargo Center in Philadelphia, Pennsylvania. 

Draft notes
The San Jose Sharks' first-round pick went to the Chicago Blackhawks as the result of a trade on June 27, 2014, that sent a first-round pick in 2014 (27th overall) and Florida's third-round pick in 2014 (62nd overall) to San Jose in exchange for the Rangers sixth-round pick in 2014 (179th overall) and this pick.
The Chicago Blackhawks' first-round pick went to the San Jose Sharks as the result of a trade on June 27, 2014, that sent a first-round pick in 2014 (20th overall) and the Rangers sixth-round pick in 2014 (179th overall) to Chicago in exchange for Florida's third-round pick in 2014 (62nd overall) and this pick.
The Chicago Blackhawks' second-round pick went to the Arizona Coyotes as the result of a trade on March 4, 2014, that sent David Rundblad and Mathieu Brisebois to Chicago in exchange for this pick.
The Pittsburgh Penguins' third-round pick (previously acquired by the Calgary Flames) went to the Chicago Blackhawks as a result of a trade on June 28, 2014, that sent Brandon Bollig to the Flames in exchange for this pick.
The Toronto Maple Leafs' fourth-round pick went to the Chicago Blackhawks as the result of a trade June 30, 2013, that sent Dave Bolland to Toronto in exchange for a second-round pick in 2013, Anaheim's fourth-round pick in 2013 and this pick.
The Chicago Blackhawks fourth-round pick went to the New York Islanders as a result of a trade on February 6, 2014, that sent Peter Regin and Pierre-Marc Bouchard to Chicago in exchange for this pick.
The San Jose Sharks' fifth-round pick went to the Chicago Blackhawks as the result of a trade on June 30, 2013, that sent Anaheim's fourth-round pick in 2013 and a fifth-round pick in 2013 to San Jose in exchange for a fourth-round pick in 2013 and this pick.
The New York Rangers' sixth-round pick went to the Chicago Blackhawks as the result of a trade on June 27, 2014, that sent a first-round pick and Florida's third-round pick both in 2014 (27th and 62nd overall) to San Jose in exchange for a first-round pick in 2014 (20th overall) and this pick.

References

Chicago Blackhawks seasons
Chicago
Chicago
Western Conference (NHL) championship seasons
Stanley Cup championship seasons
Chic
Chic
2015 in sports in Illinois